Syncretism is the practice of combining  different beliefs and various schools of thought. Syncretism involves the merging or assimilation of several originally discrete traditions, especially in the theology and mythology of religion, thus asserting an underlying unity and allowing for an inclusive approach to other faiths. Syncretism also occurs commonly in expressions of art and culture, known as eclecticism, as well as in politics, known as syncretic politics.

Nomenclature
He cites the example of the Cretans, who compromised and reconciled their differences and came together in alliance when faced with external dangers. "And that is their so-called Syncretism [Union of Cretans]". More likely as an etymology is sun- ("with") plus kerannumi ("mix") and its related noun, "krasis," "mixture."

Social and political roles 

Overt syncretism in folk belief may show cultural acceptance of an alien or previous tradition, but the "other" cult may survive or infiltrate without authorized syncresis. For example, some conversos developed a sort of cult for martyr-victims of the Spanish Inquisition, thus incorporating elements of Catholicism while resisting it.

The Kushite kings who ruled Upper Egypt for approximately a century and the whole of Egypt for approximately 57 years, from 721 to 664 BCE, constituting the Twenty-fifth Dynasty in Manetho's Aegyptiaca, developed a syncretic worship identifying their own god Dedun with the Egyptian Osiris. They maintained that worship even after they had been driven out of Egypt. A temple dedicated to this syncretic god, built by the Kushite ruler Atlanersa, was unearthed at Jebel Barkal.

Syncretism was common during the Hellenistic period, with rulers regularly identifying local deities in various parts of their domains with the relevant god or goddess of the Greek Pantheon as a means of increasing the cohesion of their kingdom. This practice was accepted in most locations but vehemently rejected by the Jews, who considered the identification of Yahweh with the Greek Zeus as the worst of blasphemy.

All major religious conversions of populations have had elements from prior religious traditions incorporated into legends or doctrine that endure with the newly converted laity.

Religious syncretism 

Religious syncretism is the blending of two or more religious belief systems into a new system, or the incorporation into a religious tradition of beliefs from unrelated traditions. This can occur for many reasons, and the latter scenario happens quite commonly in areas where multiple religious traditions exist in proximity and function actively in a culture, or when a culture is conquered, and the conquerors bring their religious beliefs with them, but do not succeed in entirely eradicating the old beliefs or (especially) practices.

Religions may have syncretic elements to their beliefs or history, but adherents of so-labeled systems often frown on applying the label, especially adherents who belong to "revealed" religious systems, such as the Abrahamic religions, or any system that exhibits an exclusivist approach. Such adherents sometimes see syncretism as a betrayal of their pure truth. By this reasoning, adding an incompatible belief corrupts the original religion, rendering it no longer true. Indeed, critics of a syncretistic trend may use the word or its variants as a disparaging epithet, as a charge implying that those who seek to incorporate a new view, belief, or practice into a religious system pervert the original faith. Non-exclusivist systems of belief, on the other hand, may feel quite free to incorporate other traditions into their own. Keith Ferdinando notes that the term "syncretism" is an elusive one, and can apply to refer to substitution or modification of the central elements of a religion by beliefs or practices introduced from elsewhere. The consequence under such a definition, according to Ferdinando, can lead to a fatal "compromise" of the original religion's "integrity".

In modern secular society, religious innovators sometimes construct new faiths or key tenets syncretically, with the added benefit or aim of reducing inter-religious discord. Such chapters often have a side-effect of arousing jealousy and suspicion among authorities and ardent adherents of the pre-existing religion. Such religions tend to inherently appeal to an inclusive, diverse audience. Sometimes the state itself sponsored such new movements, such as the Living Church founded in Soviet Russia and the German Evangelical Church in Nazi Germany, chiefly to stem all outside influences.

Cultures and societies 

According to some authors, "Syncretism is often used to describe the product of the large-scale imposition of one alien culture, religion, or body of practices over another that is already present." Others such as Jerry H. Bentley, however, have argued that syncretism has also helped to create cultural compromise. It provides an opportunity to bring beliefs, values, and customs from one cultural tradition into contact with, and to engage different cultural traditions. Such a migration of ideas is generally successful only when there is a resonance between both traditions. While, as Bentley has argued, there are numerous cases where expansive traditions have won popular support in foreign lands, this is not always so.

Din-i Ilahi

In the 16th century, the Mughal emperor Akbar proposed a new religion called the Din-i Ilahi ("Divine Faith"). Sources disagree with respect to whether it was one of many Sufi orders or merged some of the elements of the various religions of his empire. Din-i Ilahi drew elements primarily from Islam and Hinduism but also from Christianity, Jainism, and Zoroastrianism. More resembling a personality cult than a religion, it had no sacred scriptures, no priestly hierarchy, and fewer than 20 disciples, all hand-picked by Akbar himself.  It is also accepted that the policy of sulh-i-kul, which formed the essence of the Dīn-i Ilāhī, was adopted by Akbar as a part of general imperial administrative policy. Sulh-i-kul means "universal peace".

During the Enlightenment 
The syncretic deism of Matthew Tindal undermined Christianity's claim to uniqueness. The modern, rational non-pejorative connotations of syncretism arguably date from Denis Diderot's Encyclopédie articles: Eclecticisme and Syncrétistes, Hénotiques, ou Conciliateurs.  Diderot portrayed syncretism as the concordance of eclectic sources.  Scientific or legalistic approaches of subjecting all claims to critical thinking prompted at this time much literature in Europe and the Americas studying non-European religions such as Edward Moor's The Hindu Pantheon of 1810, much of which was almost evangelistically appreciative, embracing spirituality and creating the space and tolerance in particular disestablishment of religion (or its stronger form, official secularisation as in France) whereby believers of spiritualism, agnosticism, atheists and in many cases more innovative or pre-Abrahimic based religions could promote and spread their belief system, whether in the family or beyond.

See also 

 Confederacy
 Conflation
 Cultural appropriation
 Cultural assimilation
 Multiculturalism
 Multiple religious belonging
 Religious pluralism

Notes

Further reading 
 
 
 
 HadžiMuhamedović, Safet (2018) Waiting for Elijah: Time and Encounter in a Bosnian Landscape. New York and Oxford: Berghahn Books.
 HadžiMuhamedović, Safet (2018) "Syncretic Debris: From Shared Bosnian Saints to the ICTY Courtroom". In: A. Wand (ed.) Tradition, Performance and Identity Politics in European Festivals (special issue of Ethnoscripts 20:1).
 Cotter, John (1990). The New Age and Syncretism, in the World and in the Church. Long Prairie, Minn.: Neumann Press. 38 p. N.B.: The approach to the issue is from a conservative Roman Catholic position.

External links